Lanistes elliptus is a species of large freshwater snail, an aquatic gastropod mollusk with a gill and an operculum in the family Ampullariidae, the apple snails.

It is found in the Democratic Republic of the Congo, Malawi, and Mozambique.

References

Ampullariidae
Taxonomy articles created by Polbot